G. formosa may refer to:

 Geothlypis formosa, a New World warbler
 Glaucopis formosa, an African moth
 Grevillea formosa, a shrub endemic to Northern Territory
 Guentheridia formosa, a pufferfish native to the coasts of the eastern Pacific Ocean